Boczki Chełmońskie    is a village in the administrative district of Gmina Kocierzew Południowy, within Łowicz County, Łódź Voivodeship, in central Poland.

The village has a population of 347.

In 2018 village name has changed to Boczki Chełmońskie, due to resident's wish. Name was used by locals many years earlier owing to Józef Chełmoński, famous Polish painter, who was born here.

References
 Central Statistical Office (GUS) Population: Size and Structure by Administrative Division - (2007-12-31) (in Polish)

Villages in Łowicz County